Eastover is a historic estate located at Salisbury, Rowan County, North Carolina.  The mansion was designed by architect Louis H. Asbury (1877-1975) in 1934, and built between 1935 and 1936.  It is a -story, Tudor Revival style brick dwelling with decorative half-timbering with stucco fields and a dull red terra cotta tile roof.  Other contributing resources are the estate grounds, entrance gate (c. 1935), and one-story frame American Craftsman-style well-house.

It was added to the National Register of Historic Places in 2011.

References

Houses on the National Register of Historic Places in North Carolina
Tudor Revival architecture in North Carolina
Houses completed in 1936
Houses in Rowan County, North Carolina
National Register of Historic Places in Rowan County, North Carolina